Since declaring independence in 1821, Mexico has adopted a number of constitutions or other documents of basic law with constitutional effects. Not all these can be considered constitutions, and not all of them enjoyed universal application. Those  enacted in  1824, 1857, and 1917 are generally considered full-fledged, operational constitutions.  The Constitution of 1824 established the framework of a federated republic, following the short-lived monarchy of Agustín de Iturbide (in 1821–22). The Constitution of 1857 was the framework set by Mexican liberals that incorporated particular laws into the constitution. The Constitution of 1917 was drafted by the faction that won the Mexican Revolution, known as the Constitutionalists for their adherence to the Constitution of 1857. It strengthened the anticlerical framework of the 1857 constitution, empowered the state to expropriate private property, and set protections for organized labor. The 1917 Constitution was significantly revised in 1992 under Carlos Salinas de Gortari, eliminating anticlerical restrictions and strengthening private property rights against the State.

References

External links
Las constituciones de México – Links to on-line versions of the current and historical constitutions of Mexico (in Spanish)
Mexico - The Constitution – A brief history of the Mexican constitution from the U.S. Library of Congress

Law of Mexico

Constitutional history